The Reichstag of the Weimar Republic (1919–1933) was the lower house of Germany's parliament; the upper house was the Reichsrat, which represented the states. The Reichstag convened for the first time on 24 June 1920, taking over from the Weimar National Assembly, which had served as an interim parliament following the collapse of the German Empire in November 1918. 

Under the Weimar Constitution of 1919, the Reichstag was elected every four years by universal, equal, secret and direct suffrage, using a system of party-list proportional representation. All citizens who had reached the age of 20 were allowed to vote, including women for the first time, but excluding soldiers on active duty. The Reichstag voted on the laws of the Reich and was responsible for the budget, questions of war and peace, and confirmation of state treaties. Oversight of the Reich government (the ministers responsible for executing the laws) also resided with the Reichstag. It could force individual ministers or the entire government to resign by means of a vote of no confidence, and under Article 48 of the constitution it could rescind emergency decrees issued by the Reich president. The Reich president could dissolve the Reichstag under Article 25 of the constitution, but only once for the same reason.

The Reichstag as a free and democratic institution ceased to exist following the passage of the Enabling Act of 1933 which granted Chancellor Adolf Hitler the power to draft and enforce laws as he pleased.

Responsibilities 

The main rights, duties and responsibilities of the Reichstag were defined in the Weimar Constitution. (All references to constitutional articles can be found in the footnoted English translation).
 The Reichstag voted on proposed laws of the Reich, including budget laws (Article 85).
 It raised extraordinary loans (Article 87) and handled petitions (Article 126).
 It declared war and made peace (Article 45, II). Alliances and treaties with foreign states required Reichstag approval if they related to subjects of Reich legislation (Article 45, III).
 The enactment of a law could be suspended for two months if one-third of the Reichstag voted to do so. The majority could In turn declare it urgent, following which the Reich president could enact the law regardless of the request for suspension (Article 72).
 The Reichstag had the right of self-government; it created its own rules of procedure.
 The Reichstag could interrupt the order of the day by demanding an explanation from the minister concerned and address minor questions and written requests for information to the Reich government (§§ 55–62 and 67 Rules of Procedure).
 The Reichstag and its committees could demand the presence of any cabinet member (Article 33).
 The minister of finance was required to give an of account of the use of Reich revenues to the Reichstag (Article 86).
 The Reichstag could force the resignation of the government through a vote of no confidence (Article 54).
 It could bring charges against the chancellor, the ministers or the Reich president for culpably violating the constitution or a Reich law (Article 59).
 The Reich president could be removed from office by a popular referendum upon a resolution approved by a two-thirds majority of the Reichstag (Article 43, II).
 The Reichstag could suspend emergency measures taken by the Reich president (Article 48, III & IV) and could establish committees of inquiry (Article 35, I).
 It formed a standing committee to exercise the rights of the people's representatives with respect to the Reich government for periods when the Reichstag was not in session and after the end of an electoral term. The committee had the rights of a committee of inquiry (Article 35, II and III).
 It formed a permanent, non-public committee on foreign affairs, also with the rights of a committee of inquiry (Article 35, I and III, and § 34, I, Rules of Procedure).
 A tribunal to examine election returns was formed from members of the Reichstag and from judges of the Reich Administrative Court (Article 31).

Electoral system 
Each voter had one vote, which was cast on an electoral district ballot. The number of seats was determined by proportional representation. The number of Reichstag seats fluctuated because they depended on the total number of votes cast, with one seat allocated for 60,000 votes. In 1919 the Weimar National Assembly consisted of 421 members; in 1933 the last Reichstag had 647.

Eligible voters and voting procedures 
In the election to the Weimar National Assembly, the group of eligible voters expanded considerably, from 14,441,400 in 1912 (the last Reichstag election under the Empire) to 37,362,100 in 1919, primarily because women had been given the right to vote and the voting age was lowered from 25 to 20. Those who could not exercise the right to vote were active duty soldiers, people living in a sanatorium or nursing home and those in criminal or pre-trial detention. Citizenship had to have been obtained at least one year before election day. The election date was set by the Reich president. After November 1918 it had to be a Sunday or a public holiday, in accordance with a long-standing social democratic demand.

The Reich was divided into 35 electoral districts (sg. ) that were combined into 16 electoral associations (sg. ). The parties drew up a list of candidates for each electoral district in which they were participating and also a list of candidates at the Reich level.

A district received one seat for every 60,000 votes cast for a list, with the first 60,000 votes going to the first candidate on the list (as ranked by the party), the second 60,000 to the second candidate, and so on. Residual votes were transferred to the level of the electoral association. There, the remaining votes from the districts making up the association were added together; for a full 60,000 votes, there was one seat from the district list that had contributed the most residual votes. Any additional remaining votes were carried over to the national level where a party again received one seat (from the national list) per 60,000 votes.

A number of additional rules were added to this basic procedure. The most important was that a party could win seats only if it had received 30,000 or more votes in at least one district. Furthermore, a national list could deliver only as many seats as the party had already received in total at the lower levels. These provisions disadvantaged small parties without a regional focus. They nevertheless also resulted in a large number of parties being represented in the Reichstag. Beyond the 30,000 vote hurdle there was no minimum threshold (such as the 5% threshold of second votes in modern Germany) for a party to enter the Reichstag.

Presidents and Council of Elders 

The Reichstag president and his deputies (the Presidium) were elected by Reichstag members at the beginning of the legislative period. According to parliamentary custom, a representative of the strongest party in the Reichstag was usually elected president.

The Presidium was supported by the Council of Elders. The body consisted of the Reichstag president, the deputy presidents and a total of twenty-one members appointed by the Reichstag parties. Those appointed usually included the party chairmen. The Council of Elders was chaired and convened by the president or his deputies. The body was responsible for reaching agreement among the parties on agendas and work plans. These agreements were not, however, legally binding. The Council of Elders also determined the chairmen of the committees and their deputies as well as certain other organizational issues. In spite of its limited powers, the Council of Elders had considerable importance for the functioning of parliament.

Election results 
Between 1919 and 1933 there was one election to the constituent National Assembly and eight to the Reichstag. While parties of the political center dominated in 1919 (the Social Democratic Party of Germany (SPD), Centre Party and German Democratic Party (DDP)), the party spectrum of the Weimar Republic was characterized by fragmentation and, towards the end, increasing radicalization (the Communist Party of Germany (KPD) and the Nazi Party (NSDAP)).

End of the Republic 

The powers given to the Reich president in constitutional articles 48 and 25 (emergency decrees and dissolution of parliament) made possible the so-called presidential cabinets from 1930 onward, when the Reich president and the Reich government largely did the legislative work instead of the Reichstag. The practice was reinforced by the electoral successes of the anti-republican Nazi Party and the Communist Party of Germany, which together had a majority in the Reichstag following the Reichstag election of 31 July 1932. In 1933 the National Socialists used the two constitutional articles, along with the ability to transfer the legislative function from the Reichstag to the government through an Enabling Act, to establish a dictatorship. Following the banning of the left-wing parties and the forced self-dissolution of the center and right-wing parties in the spring of 1933, enactment of the Law Against the Formation of Parties (14 July 1933) converted the Reichstag into a one-party rubber stamp parliament dominated by the NSDAP. Its last session was held on 26 April 1942.

References

Reichstag (legislative body)
1945 disestablishments in Germany
Politics of the Weimar Republic
German Reich
German Reich